Ladenbergia is a genus of plant in the family Rubiaceae.

Species
, Plants of the World Online accepted the following species:

Ladenbergia acutifolia (Ruiz & Pav.) Klotzsch
Ladenbergia amazonensis Ducke
Ladenbergia brenesii Standl.
Ladenbergia bullata (Wedd.) Standl.
Ladenbergia buntingii Steyerm.
Ladenbergia carua (Wedd.) Standl.
Ladenbergia chapadensis S.Moore
Ladenbergia cujabensis Klotzsch
Ladenbergia discolor K.Schum.
Ladenbergia dwyeri L.Andersson
Ladenbergia epiphytica L.Andersson
Ladenbergia ferruginea Standl.
Ladenbergia franciscana C.M.Taylor
Ladenbergia graciliflora K.Schum.
Ladenbergia heterophylla (Wedd.) Standl.
Ladenbergia hexandra (Pohl) Klotzsch
Ladenbergia klugii L.Andersson
Ladenbergia lambertiana (A.Br. ex Mart.) Klotzsch
Ladenbergia laurifolia Dwyer
Ladenbergia lehmanniana L.Andersson
Ladenbergia macrocarpa (Vahl) Klotzsch
Ladenbergia magdalenae L.Andersson
Ladenbergia moritziana Klotzsch
Ladenbergia muzonensis (Goudot) Standl.
Ladenbergia nubigena L.Andersson
Ladenbergia oblongifolia (Humb. ex Mutis) L.Andersson
Ladenbergia obovata L.Andersson
Ladenbergia paraensis Ducke
Ladenbergia pauciflora L.Andersson
Ladenbergia pavonii (Lamb.) Standl.
Ladenbergia pittieri Standl.
Ladenbergia riveroana (Wedd.) Standl.
Ladenbergia rubiginosa L.Andersson
Ladenbergia shawistigma Chilq.
Ladenbergia siranensis Chilq.
Ladenbergia stenocarpa (Lamb.) Klotzsch
Ladenbergia undata Klotzsch

Former species
 Ladenbergia gavanensis (Schltdl.) Standl. = Ladenbergia oblongifolia
 Ladenbergia ulei Standl. = Ladenbergia muzonensis

References 

 
Rubiaceae genera
Taxonomy articles created by Polbot